Värmlands Filmförbund is a movie organisation in Värmland, Sweden.  It was founded in 1975 by Erik Fast and Kjell Bergström.

Since 1998, it has been held in the  regional film center. The purpose of the festival is to give local filmmakers in the province of Värmland a public forum for their work. The highest honor awarded is the Filmörnen.

Filmörnen 
2015 Kry by Ylvaa Johansson
2014 Sov gott, min prinsessa by Emelie Hahne and Klara Olsson
2013 Mulldjuret by Mikael Lindahl
2012 Paper Lake by Juan Antonio Casaus, Simón Lara and Carmen Díaz
2011 Hopp by Sofia-Linn Karlsson
2010 Vad är jag by Victor Nyåker
2009 Grattis John by Stefan Askernäs
2008 Drawn to you by Emil Gustafsson Ryderup
2007 The art of clowning by Robert Ek
2006 Captive by EyeCatcher Entertainment
2005 Mein Pater, Mon Major
2004 Blind date
2003 Chimp to the Monk
2002 Izidor
2001 Lufthavn
2000 Liten, ful, gul
1999 Born in Värmland
1998 Alexanders värld
1997 Nils, en mångsysslare
1996 Der spjuver
1994 Du äter inte stuvat
1993 I skuggan av batongen
1992 Historisk blues
1991 Kom hem igen
1990 Stress
1989 Sista hoppet
1982 Ombyte förnöjer by Anders Nilsson, Kil
1981 To care or not to care
1980 Sagan om kalven by Anders Nilsson, Kil
1979 Simius
1978 Polisuppdraget by The Golden Bird Film Team

Best Documentary 
2008 Ellinor Engkvist & Sandra Dahlen for Betina den fina – mannen med hårmössan
2007 Natia Ellelund, Frida Oskarsson & Helén Ranelius for Tiden kommer till fingrar
2006 Henric Jonsson & Oliver der Nederlanden for De oskrivna reglerna
2005 Malena Wall & Amanda Wirtberg for Den himlastormande förälskelsen

Best Experimentfilm 
2008 Emil Gustafsson Ryderup for Dissident
2007 Karin Gustafsson for Embryo of shadows
2006 Trine Hylander Friis for Ut av drömmar
2005 Kristoffer Andrén for The Haiku Death Trilogy

Best Script 
2008 Jennie Andersson for Sista dagen
2007 Kristofer Bernhardtz for Vid första ögonkastet
2006 Robin Gjuraj for Kris
2005 Mattias Svensson & Jesper Fielding for Kanske till sommaren
2004 Ismael Ataria & Tomas Björklund for EvOL

Best Music 
2008 Daniel Leppänen for Manuset
2007 Johan Ekland for Klasskamp
2006 Kultiration for I mitt blod
2005 Marcus Granberg & Mattias Svensson for Kanske till sommaren

Best Editing 
2008 Tomas Holmberg, Sandra Eklund & Kristian Norta for Manuset
2007 Staffan Kvarneke for Paus
2006 Tomas Holmberg & Kristian Norta for Den otroliga historien
2005 Ola Paulakoski for Werewolf cult Chronicles: Vietnam 1969
2004 Ulf Norström & Robert P. Olsson for Old world disorder

Best Sound 
2008 Daniel Johansson for Kontakt
2007 Johan Ekland for The Art of Clowning
2006 Staffan Kvarneke for Hämndens pris and Marcus Sötterman for Fel film
2005 Ola Paulakoski for Werewolf cult Crhronicles: Vietnam 1969
2004 Ulf Norström for 13:de mars, 1941

Best Cinematography 
2008 Markus Helmersson for Drawn to you
2007 Veronika Jacobsson & Staffan Kvarneke for Slutna ögon
2006 Robin Woo Söderberg for Lev för fan
2005 Rasmus Persson for Fingers of Thunder
2004 Jimi Wikström for Poweranimal – Hybrid

Best Actress 
2008 Danielle Rhodin & Rebecca Höök in Sista dagen, Alive & more
2007 Anna Åsdell in Slutna ögon
2006 Jennie Andersson in Jakt-Lycka
2005 Kristin Ericsson in För Dig
2004 Victoria Brattström in Blind date

Best Actor 
2008 Peter Jankert in Om ödet får bestämma
2007 John Ström Båtelson in The Art of Clowning
2006 Daniel Gille in Konsten att mörda
2005 Mikael Amehag in Mein Pater, Mon Major
2004 Boris Glibusic in Blind date

Best Animation 
2007 Karl-Joel Larsson, Mikael Gustafsson, Phim Fransson & Helena Jäger for Edward

Audience Award 
2008 Där jag var som tryggast
2007 Teddy
2005 Kanske till sommaren

References

External links 
Filmörnen's homepage
Värmland Filmförbund's homepage

Film organizations in Sweden
Värmland
1975 establishments in Sweden
Film festivals established in 1978